The Evangelical Lutheran Church in Congo (Église évangélique luthérienne au Congo, ELCCo) is a Lutheran denomination in the Democratic Republic of Congo. It is a member of the Lutheran World Federation, which it joined in 1986. It is also a member of the All Africa Conference of Churches. It was known formerly as the Evangelical Lutheran Church of Zaïre.

External links 
Lutheran World Federation listing
World Council of Churches listing

Lutheran denominations
Lutheranism in Africa
Lutheran World Federation members